Stadionul Parc may refer to:

 Stadionul Parc (Breaza)
 Stadionul Parc (Caracal)